Marilyn Artus (Marilyn McBrier Artus) is a visual artist whose work explores the female experience.

Artus created "Her Flag", a nationwide collaborative art project to celebrate the 100th anniversary of the U.S. 19th Amendment. "Her Flag" was completed on August 18, 2020 in Nashville, TN. "Her Flag" premiered at the Clinton Presidential Library in Little Rock, Arkansas in 2020. It was then exhibited at the National Museum of Women in the Arts in Washington D.C. in 2021.

Career
Artus was one of the founders of The Girlie Show, a 2-day, annual all-female art and craft show in Oklahoma City that was founded in 2003. 

The Girlie Show founders, Erin Merryweather, Dawn Tyler Harth, and Marilyn Artus received the "Great Inspirations" award in 2008 from Creative Oklahoma, Inc.

Artus is the founder of the Oklahoma City branch of Dr. Sketchy's Anti-Art School.

Artus was Volunteer of the year in 2014 for Planned Parenthood of Central Oklahoma. She also serves on the board of directors for PPCO (Planned Parenthood of Central Oklahoma).

From 2009 to 2012, Artus served as board vice president for Individual Artists of Oklahoma, a non-profit organization that promotes and provides opportunities for Oklahoma artists.

She was the first recipient to receive the Brady Craft Alliance Award for Innovation in Fiber Arts in 2011.

In 2010, she led an art making workshop at The Brooklyn Museum in New York in conjunction with the retrospective exhibit Seductive Subversion: Women Pop Artists, 1958-1968.

References

External links
Her Flag Celebrates the 100th Anniversary of the 19th Amendment
The Official Marilyn Artus Website
Oklahoma Magazine Our Lady of Art
Uncovering Oklahoma Marilyn Artus
News OK Coverage
Slutist-Marilyn Artus Art as Activism and the Scarlet F
News on 6 Coverage
Fox 2 Now Coverage
We Are Austin Coverage
Fox News Coverage
Issuu Art Focus
News OK Coverage of Dr. Sketchys Anti-Art School

Living people
University of Oklahoma alumni
Year of birth missing (living people)
Artists from Oklahoma City